Eresina pseudofusca, the warm sienna eresina, is a butterfly in the family Lycaenidae. It is found in Ivory Coast, Ghana, Nigeria and western Cameroon. Its habitat consists of dense, primary forests.

References

Butterflies described in 1961
Poritiinae